The Bosnia and Herzegovina national under-19 football team is made up by players who are 19 years old or younger and represents Bosnia and Herzegovina in international football matches at this age level.

Competitive record

UEFA European U19 Championship

Mediterranean Games

2022/2023 UEFA European U19 Qualifiers

Group 5

Recent results and forthcoming fixtures

2022

Personnel

Current technical staff

Coaching history

Current squad
The following players were called up for NFSBIH Camp between 6 and 10 March 2023.
Caps and goals correct as of 27 September 2022 after the game against Estonia.

Recent call-ups
The following eligible players have been called up for the team within the last twelve months:

 PRE

 
 
 PRE
 
 WD

INJ Withdrawn due to injury.
PRE Preliminary squad.
SUS Suspended.
WD Withdrew.

See also 
 European Under-19 Football Championship
 Bosnia and Herzegovina men's national football team
 Bosnia and Herzegovina men's national under-21 football team
 Bosnia and Herzegovina men's national under-18 football team
 Bosnia and Herzegovina men's national under-17 football team
 Bosnia and Herzegovina men's national under-15 football team
 Bosnia and Herzegovina women's national football team
 Bosnia and Herzegovina women's national under-19 football team
 Bosnia and Herzegovina women's national under-17 football team

References

External links
 UEFA Under-19 website Contains full results archive

European national under-19 association football teams
Bosnia and Herzegovina national youth football teams